Thanin Kraivichien (first name also spelled Tanin, last name Kraivixien or Kraivichian; , , ; born 5 April 1927) is a Thai former judge, politician and law professor. He was the prime minister of Thailand between 1976 and 1977. Subsequently, he was a member of the Privy Council until 2016 when he was appointed the position of President, replacing Prem Tinsulanonda.

Family and education 
Thanin is a son of Hae and Pa-ob Kraivichien. He was born in Bangkok. His father was a Chinese-born merchant and owner of one of the biggest pawnshops in Bangkok. Thanin studied law at Thammasat University, graduating in 1948. He then went to the London School of Economics to continue with his law studies. He graduated in 1953, and in 1958 was called to the Bar at Gray's Inn.

In Britain, he met Karen Anderson, a native of Denmark, whom he married. They have five children.

Judicial career 
After he returned to Thailand in 1954, Thanin worked in the ministry of justice, becoming an associate judge. He rose quickly, finally becoming President of the Supreme Court of Thailand. Additionally, he taught law at Thammasat and Chulalongkorn universities and the Thai Bar Association. As an avocation, he published books that warned of the dangers of communism.

After the democratic uprising against military dictatorship in 1973, Thanin was a member of the transitional legislative assembly appointed by the king. He became a member of the far-right anti-communist Nawaphon movement. He had a TV show in which he attacked communism, the students' movement, and progressive politicians.

Premiership 

After the Thammasat University massacre of 6 October 1976, the democratically elected prime minister Seni Pramoj was toppled by a military coup led by Admiral Sangad Chaloryu. Two days later, King Bhumibol Adulyadej appointed his favourite, Thanin, to be interim prime minister. Thanin insisted on selecting his cabinet himself and rejected most of the military junta's nominations. The military occupied only the positions of deputy prime minister and deputy minister of defence. Thanin led the first Thai cabinet in which women, Wimolsiri Chamnarnvej and Lursakdi Sampatisiri, held ministerial posts. Thanin was seen as honest and intelligent but also eminently ideological and politically extreme. After his taking office, he sent police special forces to notoriously liberal book shops, and ordered the confiscation and burning of 45,000 books, including works of Thomas More, George Orwell, and Maxim Gorky.

Thanin announced that Thailand could return to democratic rule only after 12 years. The parliament was dissolved and all political parties outlawed. Thanin's crackdown on trade unions, progressive students' and farmers' associations drove activists into the underground structures of the Communist Party of Thailand. Instead of weakening the communists, it fuelled their armed struggle against the government. In March 1977, a group of younger army officers known as the "Young Turks", who had an interest in political matters, tried to topple Thanin. Their attempted coup failed. On 20 October 1977, however, Admiral Sangad again seized power and pressed Thanin to resign. The military justified their intervention because Thanin's government had divided the country and had virtually no public support, the economic situation had worsened, and people in general disagreed with such a long-term suspension of democracy.

Privy Councillor 
King Bhumibol Adulyadej immediately appointed Thanin to his Privy Council. During the vacancy of the throne after Bhumibol's death on 13 October 2016, the former President of the Privy Council, Prem Tinsulanonda, served as regent and interim head of state. Thanin temporarily assumed the office of President of the Privy Council during this period. After King Vajiralongkorn's accession to the throne on 1 December 2016, Prem returned to his earlier position, while Thanin was not reappointed to the Privy Council at all.

Academic rank
 Professor of Chulalongkorn University

References

1927 births
Living people
Thanin Kraivichien
Thanin Kraivichien
Thanin Kraivichien
Thanin Kraivichien
Thanin Kraivichien
Thanin Kraivichien
Thanin Kraivichien
Thanin Kraivichien
Members of Gray's Inn
Thanin Kraivichien
Alumni of the London School of Economics
Thanin Kraivichien
Leaders ousted by a coup